Lotfollah Dezhkam is the Representative of the Supreme Leader in Fars province, Imam of Friday Prayer of Shiraz and the Representative of Fars in Assembly of Experts.

In a speech he has stated, “The global arrogance led by America with complicity of Israel seeks to delay the realization of an important issue, which is the destruction of the Zionist regime.” Calling for the destruction of the nationhood of Israel.

References 

4. https://www.jpost.com/international/iran-regime-supreme-leaders-rep-calls-for-destruction-of-israel-680835

Representatives of the Supreme Leader in the Provinces of Iran
Iranian ayatollahs
1962 births
Living people
People from Jahrom